The Superior Court of Justice (also known as STJ) is the highest appellate court in Brazil for non-constitutional questions of federal law. The STJ also has original jurisdiction over some cases. Its competence is described in Article 105 of the Brazilian Constitution of 1988.

A Special Appeal (in Portuguese, Recurso Especial) can be made to this court when a judgement of a court of second instance offends a federal statutory provision or when second instance courts have issued different interpretations of the same federal statute.

By rule, the STJ decides only questions of law, not any questions of fact and the probatory elements on the case, about which the Second Instance Courts give the last word.

As in other superior courts in Brazil, STJ's justices are called "ministers", not to be confused with ministers from the executive branch.

History

Prior to late 1988, Brazil had only the Supreme Federal Court (STF) as the Court of last resort, which would hear all highest appeals of mostly any matters, including other Higher, National Courts. As demand on the Judiciary was becoming intense, with a growing number of suits and cases, largely the result of the accessibility generated by the multiplication of first instance Courts, the STF found itself in a critical situation of unmanageable volume of service, urging for a correcting measure.

As the National Constitution Assembly started in 1987, one of the earliest projects to be included and eventually approved was the creation of a new National Court, in parallel with the already existing Superior Labour, Military and Electoral Tribunals, placing the STF on a higher degree. It was the beginning of the Superior Court of Justice (STJ), to which were transferred most of the issues then heard by the STF.

The STJ was physically placed in the building previously occupied by the Federal Court of Appeals (also called TFR,  or ). The TFR was a stand-alone Tribunal mainly designed to hear all ordinary appeals from decisions by Federal Judges. Although having a parallel jurisdiction to second-instance State Courts, its judges were called "Ministers", denomination given to Justices from higher Courts. It was extinguished by the 1988 Constitution, which distributed all its competence to the new Federal Regional Courts (a total of five, placed around the national territory), with the Ministers from the TFR becoming the initial Justices of the STJ.

The Superior Court of Justice had its competence slightly altered by Amendment 45/2004, which transferred to the Court cases like the homologation of foreign court orders.

See also
Brazil federal courts

References

http://www.stj.jus.br/

External links
Official website

Judiciary of Brazil
1989 establishments in Brazil
Courts and tribunals established in 1989